City Park is a public park in Benicia, California that features a bus station served by SolTrans. It is the site of the first Protestant church in California: a Presbyterian church which stood between 1849 and 1875.  It was also home to a seminary.

References

External links
City Park - City of Benicia

Municipal parks in California
Parks in Solano County, California
Parks in the San Francisco Bay Area
Bus stations in Solano County, California